Sơn Trà is an urban district (quận) of Da Nang in the South Central Coast region of Vietnam. As of 2003 the district had a population of 112,196. The district covers an area of 60 km². The district is bounded by ocean to the north and east, the Hàn River to the west, and Ngũ Hành Sơn district to the south. Sơn Trà Mountain occupies a large portion of the district.

The district is divided into 7 wards (phường):
An Hải Bắc
An Hải Đông
An Hải Tây
Mân Thái
Nại Hiên Đông
Phước Mỹ
Thọ Quang
The district capital lies at An Hải Tây ward.

References

Districts of Da Nang